The men's normal hill individual ski jumping competition for the 2002 Winter Olympics was held in Park City, Utah. Both qualifying and the final rounds took place on 10 February 2002 after heavy wind caused a cancellation of the qualifying round on 9 February 2002.

Results

Qualifying

Twelve skiers were pre-qualified, on the basis of their World Cup performance, meaning that they directly advanced to the final round. These skiers still jumped in the qualifying round, but they were not included with non-pre-qualified skiers in the standings. The fifty-four skiers who were not pre-qualified competed for thirty-eight spots in the final round.

Final
The final consisted of two jumps, with the top thirty after the first jump qualifying for the second jump. The combined total of the two jumps was used to determine the final ranking.

References

Ski jumping at the 2002 Winter Olympics